Samantha Navarro (born 14 August 1971 Montevideo, Uruguay) is a Uruguayan singer, composer, and guitarist.

References

External links

1971 births
Living people
People from Montevideo
21st-century Uruguayan women singers
Uruguayan composers
Uruguayan guitarists
LGBT composers
Uruguayan LGBT singers
21st-century guitarists
21st-century women guitarists